Hofstede's cultural dimensions theory is a framework for cross-cultural communication, developed by Geert Hofstede. It shows the effects of a society's culture on the values of its members, and how these values relate to behavior, using a structure derived from factor analysis.

Hofstede developed his original model as a result of using factor analysis to examine the results of a worldwide survey of employee values by IBM between 1967 and 1973. It has been refined since. The original theory proposed four dimensions along which cultural values could be analyzed: individualism-collectivism; uncertainty avoidance; power distance (strength of social hierarchy) and masculinity-femininity (task-orientation versus person-orientation). The Hofstede Cultural Dimensions factor analysis is based on extensive cultural preferences research conducted by Gert Jan Hofstede and his research teams. Hofstede based his research on national cultural preferences rather than individual cultural preferences. Professor Hofstede included six key aspects of national culture country comparison scales, including: the power distance index (PDI), individualism vs. collectivism (IDV), masculinity versus femininity (MAS), uncertainty avoidance index (UAI), long term orientation versus short term normative orientation (LTO), and indulgence versus restraint (IVR). The PDI describes the degree to which authority is accepted and followed. The IDV measures the extent to which people look out for each other as a team or look out for themselves as an individual. MAS represents specific values that a society values. The UAI describes to what extent nations avoid the unknown. LTO expresses how societies either prioritize traditions or seek for the modern in their dealings with the present and the future. The IVR index is a comparison between a country's willingness to wait for long-term benefits by holding off on instant gratification, or preferences to no restraints on enjoying life at the present.

Independent research in Hong Kong led Hofstede to add a fifth dimension, long-term orientation, to cover aspects of values not discussed in the original paradigm.  In 2010, Hofstede added a sixth dimension, indulgence versus self-restraint. Hofstede's work established a major research tradition in cross-cultural psychology and has also been drawn upon by researchers and consultants in many fields relating to international business and communication. The theory has been widely used in several fields as a paradigm for research, particularly in cross-cultural psychology, international management, and cross-cultural communication.  It continues to be a major resource in cross-cultural fields.

History 
In 1965 Hofstede founded the personnel research department of IBM Europe (which he managed until 1971). Between 1967 and 1973, he executed a large survey study regarding national values differences across the worldwide subsidiaries of this multinational corporation: he compared the answers of 117,000 IBM matched employees samples on the same attitude survey in different countries. He first focused his research on the 40 largest countries, and then extended it to 50 countries and 3 regions, "at that time probably the largest matched-sample cross-national database available anywhere." The theory was one of the first quantifiable theories that could be used to explain observed differences between cultures. 
 
This initial analysis identified systematic differences in national cultures on four primary dimensions: power distance (PDI), individualism (IDV), uncertainty avoidance (UAI) and masculinity (MAS), which are described below. As Hofstede explains on his academic website, these dimensions regard "four anthropological problem areas that different national societies handle differently: ways of coping with inequality, ways of coping with uncertainty, the relationship of the individual with her or his primary group, and the emotional implications of having been born as a girl or as a boy". In 1984 he published Culture's Consequences, a book which combines the statistical analysis from the survey research with his personal experiences.
 
In order to confirm the early results from the IBM study and to extend them to a variety of populations, six subsequent cross-national studies were successfully conducted between 1990 and 2002. Covering between 14 and 28 countries each, the samples included commercial airline pilots, students, civil service managers, 'up-market' consumers and 'elites'. The combined research established value scores on the four dimensions for a total of 76 countries and regions.
 
In 1991 Michael Harris Bond and colleagues conducted a study among students in 23 countries, using a survey instrument developed with Chinese employees and managers. The results from this study led Hofstede to add a new fifth dimension to his model: long-term orientation (LTO), initially called Confucian dynamism. In 2010, the scores for this dimension were extended to 93 countries thanks to the research of Michael Minkov, who used data from the recent World Values Survey. Further research has refined some of the original dimensions, and introduced the difference between country-level and individual-level data in analysis.

Finally, Minkov's World Values Survey data analysis of 93 representative samples of national populations also led Geert Hofstede to identify a sixth last dimension: indulgence versus restraint.

Dimensions of national cultures

Power distance index (PDI): The power distance index is defined as "the extent to which the less powerful members of organizations and institutions (like the family) accept and expect that power is distributed unequally". A higher degree of the Index indicates that hierarchy is clearly established and executed in society, without doubt or reason. A lower degree of the Index signifies that people question authority and attempt to distribute power.
Individualism vs. collectivism (IDV):  This index explores the "degree to which people in a society are integrated into groups". Individualistic societies have loose ties that often only relate an individual to his/her immediate family. They emphasize the "I" versus the "we". Its counterpart, collectivism, describes a society in which tightly integrated relationships tie extended families and others into in-groups. These in-groups are laced with undoubted loyalty and support each other when a conflict arises with another in-group.
Uncertainty avoidance (UAI): The uncertainty avoidance index is defined as "a society's tolerance for ambiguity", in which people embrace or avert an event of something unexpected, unknown, or away from the status quo. Societies that score a high degree in this index opt for stiff codes of behavior, guidelines, laws, and generally rely on absolute truth, or the belief that one lone truth dictates everything and that people know what it is. A lower degree in this index shows more acceptance of differing thoughts or ideas. Society tends to impose fewer regulations, ambiguity is more accustomed to, and the environment is more free-flowing.
Masculinity vs. femininity (MAS): In this dimension, masculinity is defined as "a preference in society for achievement, heroism, assertiveness, and material rewards for success." Its counterpart represents "a preference for cooperation, modesty, caring for the weak, and quality of life." Women in the respective societies tend to display different values. In feminine societies, they share modest and caring views equally with men. In more masculine societies, women are somewhat assertive and competitive, but notably less than men. In other words, they still recognize a gap between male and female values. This dimension is frequently viewed as taboo in highly masculine societies.
Long-term orientation vs. short-term orientation (LTO): This dimension associates the connection of the past with the current and future actions/challenges. A lower degree of this index (short-term) indicates that traditions are honored and kept, while steadfastness is valued. Societies with a high degree in this index (long-term) view adaptation and circumstantial, pragmatic problem-solving as a necessity. A poor country that is short-term oriented usually has little to no economic development, while long-term oriented countries continue to develop to a level of prosperity.
Indulgence vs. restraint (IND): This dimension refers to the degree of freedom that societal norms give to citizens in fulfilling their human desires. Indulgence is defined as "a society that allows relatively free gratification of basic and natural human desires related to enjoying life and having fun". Its counterpart is defined as "a society that controls gratification of needs and regulates it by means of strict social norms".

Differences between cultures on the values dimensions
Putting together national scores (from 1 for the lowest to 100 for the highest), Hofstede's six-dimensions model allows international comparison between cultures, also called comparative research:

Power distance index shows very high scores for Latin American and Asian countries, African areas and the Arab world. On the other hand, Germanic countries, including Anglophone countries, have a lower power distance (only 11 for Austria and 18 for Denmark).
For example, the United States has a 40 on the cultural scale of Hofstede's analysis. Compared to Guatemala where the power distance is very high (95) and Israel where it is very low (13), the United States is in the middle.

Germany scores a high UAI (65) and Belgium even more (94) compared to Sweden (29) or Denmark (23) despite their geographic proximity. However, few countries have very low UAI.
Masculinity is extremely low in Nordic countries: Norway scores 8 and Sweden only 5. In contrast, Masculinity is very high in Japan (95), and in European countries like Hungary, Austria and Switzerland influenced by German culture. In the Anglo world, masculinity scores are relatively high with 66 for the United Kingdom for example. Latin American countries present contrasting scores: for example Venezuela has a 73-point score whereas Chile's is only 28.
High long-term orientation scores are typically found in East Asia, with South Korea having the highest possible score of 100, Taiwan 93 and Japan 88. They are moderate in Eastern and Western Europe, and low in the Anglo countries, Africa and in Latin America. However, there is less data about this dimension.
Individualism (IDV) is high in the US (91), Australia (90), and Great Britain (89). Contrarily Hong Kong and Serbia (25), Malaysia (26), and Portugal (27) are considered to be collectivists.
There is even less data about the sixth dimension. Indulgence scores are highest in Latin America, parts of Africa, the Anglo world and Nordic Europe; restraint is mostly found in East Asia and Eastern Europe.

Correlations of values with other country differences
Researchers have grouped some countries together by comparing countries' value scores with other country difference such as geographical proximity, shared language, related historical background, similar religious beliefs and practices, common philosophical influences, and identical political systems; in other words, everything which is implied by the definition of a nation's culture. For example, low power distance is associated with consultative political practices and income equity, whereas high power distance is correlated with unequal income distribution, as well as bribery and corruption in domestic politics. Individualism is positively correlated with social mobility, national wealth, or the quality of government. As a country becomes richer, its culture becomes more individualistic.

Another example of correlation was drawn by the Sigma Two Group in 2003. They have studied the correlation between countries' cultural dimensions and their predominant religion based on the World Factbook 2002. On average, predominantly Catholic countries show very high uncertainty avoidance, relatively high power distance, moderate masculinity and relatively low individualism, whereas predominantly atheist countries have low uncertainty avoidance, very high power distance, moderate masculinity, and very low individualism. Coelho (2011) found inverse correlations between rates of specific kinds of innovation in manufacturing companies and the percentage of large companies per country as well as the employment of a specific kind of manufacturing strategy.

The quantification of cultural dimensions enables people to make cross-regional comparisons and form an image of the differences between not just countries but entire regions. For example, the cultural model of the Mediterranean countries is dominated by high levels of acceptance of inequalities, with uncertainty aversion influencing their choices. With regard to individualism, Mediterranean countries tend to be characterized by moderate levels of individualistic behavior. The same applies to masculinity. Future orientation places Mediterranean countries in a middle ranking, and they show a preference for indulgence values.

Power distance index is positively correlated with the ratio of companies with process innovation only over the companies with any of the three types of innovation considered in the country (determinant of correlation: 28%). Hence in countries with higher power distance, innovative manufacturing companies are somewhat more bound to resort to process innovations. Power distance index occurs more often in technological societies with a representative government and a good basic education system, whereas high PDI is associated with economic inequality.

Applications of the model

Importance of cultural-difference awareness

Instead of the convergence phenomena experts expected with information technology proliferation (the "global village culture"), cultural differences are still significant today and diversity has tended to increase. So, in order to be able to have respectful cross-cultural relations, we have to be aware of these cultural differences.
 
With this model, Geert Hofstede shed light on these differences. The tool can be used to give a general overview and an approximate understanding of other cultures, what to expect from them and how to behave towards groups from other countries.

Practical applications of theory
Geert Hofstede is perhaps the best known sociologist of culture and anthropologist in the context of applications for understanding international business.  Many articles and research papers refer to his publications, with over 26,000 citations to his 2001 book Culture's Consequences: Comparing Values, Behaviors, Institutions and Organizations Across Nations (which is an updated version of his first publication). The five dimensions model is widely used in many domains of human social life, and particularly in the field of business. Practical applications were developed almost immediately.

International communication
In business it is commonly agreed that communication is one of the primary concerns. So, for professionals who work internationally; people who interact daily with other people from different countries within their company or with other companies abroad; Hofstede's model gives insights into other cultures. In fact, cross-cultural communication requires being aware of cultural differences because what may be considered perfectly acceptable and natural in one country, can be confusing or even offensive in another. All the levels in communication are affected by cultural dimensions: verbals (words and language itself), non-verbals (body language, gestures) and etiquette do's and don'ts (clothing, gift-giving, dining, customs and protocol).  This is also valid for written communication, as explained in William Wardrobe's essay Beyond Hofstede: Cultural applications for communication with Latin American Businesses.

International negotiation
In international negotiations, communication style, expectation, issue ranking and goals will change according to the negotiators' countries of origin. If applied properly, an understanding of cultural dimensions should increase success in negotiations and reduce frustration and conflicts. For example, in a negotiation between Chinese and Canadians, the Canadian negotiators may want to reach an agreement and sign a contract, whereas the Chinese negotiators may want to spend more time for non-business activities, small-talk and hospitality with preferences for protocol and form in order to first establish the relationship.
"When negotiating in Western countries, the objective is to work toward a target of mutual understanding and agreement and 'shake-hands' when that agreement is reached – a cultural signal of the end of negotiations and the start of 'working together'.
In Middle Eastern countries much negotiation takes place leading into the 'agreement', signified by shaking hands. However, the deal is not complete in the Middle Eastern culture. In fact, it is a cultural sign that 'serious' negotiations are just beginning."

International management
These considerations are also true in international management and cross-cultural leadership. Decisions taken have to be based on the country's customs and values.

When working in international companies, managers may provide training to their employees to make them sensitive to cultural differences, develop nuanced business practices, with protocols across countries. Hofstede's dimensions offer guidelines for defining culturally acceptable approaches to corporate organizations.

As a part of the public domain, Geert Hofstede's work is used by numerous consultancies worldwide.

International marketing
The six-dimension model is very useful in international marketing because it defines national values not only in business context but in general. Marieke de Mooij has studied the application of Hofstede's findings in the field of global branding, advertising strategy and consumer behavior. As companies try to adapt their products and services to local habits and preferences they have to understand the specificity of their market.

For example, if you want to market cars in a country where the uncertainty avoidance is high, you should emphasize their safety, whereas in other countries you may base your advertisement on the social image they give you.
Cell phone marketing is another interesting example of the application of Hofstede's model for cultural differences: if you want to advertise cell phones in China, you may show a collective experience whereas in the United States you may show how an individual uses it to save time and money.
The variety of application of Hofstede's abstract theory is so wide that it has even been translated in the field of web designing in which you have to adapt to national preferences according to cultures' values.

Limitations of Hofstede's model
Even though Hofstede's model is generally accepted as the most comprehensive framework of national cultures' values by those studying business culture, its validity and its limitations have been extensively criticized.

The most cited critique is McSweeney. Hofstede replied to that critique and McSweeney responded. Also Ailon deconstructed Hofstede's book Culture's Consequences by mirroring it against its own assumptions and logic. Ailon finds inconsistencies at the level of both theory and methodology and cautions against an uncritical reading of Hofstede's cultural dimensions. Hofstede replied to that critique and Ailon responded.

Questionable choice of national level
Aside from Hofstede's six cultural dimensions, there are other factors on which culture can be analyzed. There are other levels for assessing culture besides the level of the nation-state. These levels are overlooked often because of the nature of the construction of these levels.  There is sampling discrepancy that disqualifies the survey from being authoritative on organizations, or societies, or nations as the interviews involved sales and engineering personnel with few, if any, women and undoubtedly fewer social minorities participating (Moussetes, 2007).  Even if country indices were used to control for wealth, latitude, population size, density and growth; privileged males working as engineers or sales personnel in one of the elite organizations of the world, pioneering one of the first multinational projects in history, cannot be claimed to represent their nations.

Individual level: cultural dimensions versus individual personalities

Hofstede acknowledges that the cultural dimensions he identified, as culture and values, are theoretical constructions. They are tools meant to be used in practical applications. Generalizations about one country's culture are helpful but they have to be regarded as such, i.e. as guidelines for a better understanding. They are group-level dimensions which describe national averages which apply to the population in its entirety. Hofstede's cultural dimensions enable users to distinguish countries but are not about differences between members of societies. They don't necessarily define individuals' personalities. National scores should never be interpreted as deterministic for individuals. For example, a Japanese person can be very comfortable in changing situations whereas on average, Japanese people have high uncertainty avoidance. There are still exceptions to the rule.
Hofstede's theory can be contrasted with its equivalence at individual level: the trait theory about human personality.

Variations on the typologies of collectivism and individualism have been proposed (Triandis, 1995; Gouveia and Ros, 2000). Self-expression and individualism usually increase with economic growth (Inglehart, 1997) independent of any culture, and can help small populations faced with outside competition for resources. (Some examples do exist of collectivist cultures that experienced rapid economic growth yet held on to their collectivist culture, such as the citizens of United Arab Emirates  and other GCC nations).  Entitled individuals in positions of power embrace autonomy even if they live in a "collective" culture.  Like the power index, the individualism and collectivism surveys scatter countries according to predictable economic and demographic patterns (Triandis, 2004), so they might not really inform us at all about any particular organizational dynamic, nor do they inform about the organizational and individual variations within similar socio-economic circumstances.  Individual aggregate need careful separation from nation aggregate (Smith et al., 2008). Whereas individuals are the basic subject of psychological analysis (Smith, 2004), the socialization of individuals and their interaction with society is a matter to be studied at the level of families, peers, neighborhoods, schools, cities, and nations each with its own statistical imprint of culture (Smith, 2004). S. Schwartz controlled his value data with GNP and a social index, leading to his proposal of differentiated individual and nation indices of itemized values (Schwartz, 1992; 1994) for cross-cultural comparison.  The assumed "isomorphism of constructs" has been central to deciding how to use and understand culture in the managerial sciences (Van de Vijver et al. 2008; Fischer, 2009).  As no individual can create his/her discourse and sense-making process in isolation to the rest of society, individuals are poor candidates for cultural sense-making. Postmodern criticism rejects the possibility of any self-determining individual because the unitary, personal self is an illusion of contemporary society evidenced by the necessary reproductions and simulations in language and behavior that individuals engage in to sustain membership in any society (Baudrillard, 1983; Alvesson & Deetz, 2006).

Organizational level
Within and across countries, individuals are also parts of organizations such as companies. Hofstede acknowledges that "the […] dimensions of national cultures are not relevant for comparing organizations within the same country". In contrast with national cultures embedded in values, organizational cultures are embedded in practices.

From 1985 to 1987, Hofstede's institute IRIC (Institute for Research on Intercultural Cooperation) has conducted a separate research project in order to study organizational culture. Including 20 organizational units in two countries (Denmark and the Netherlands), six different dimensions of practices, or communities of practice have been identified:

 Process-Oriented vs. Results-Oriented
 Employee-Oriented vs. Job-Oriented
 Parochial vs. Professional
 Open System vs. Closed System
 Loose Control vs. Tight Control
 Pragmatic vs. Normative
Managing international organizations involves understanding both national and organizational cultures. Communities of practice across borders are significant for multinationals in order to hold the company together.

Occupational level

Within the occupational level, there is a certain degree of values and convictions that people hold with respect to the national and organizational cultures they are part of. The culture of management as an occupation has components from national and organizational cultures. This is an important distinction from the organizational level.

Gender level

When describing culture, gender differences are largely not taken into consideration. However, there are certain factors that are useful to analyze in the discussion of cross-cultural communication. According to Hofstede's model, men's culture differs greatly from women's culture within each society. Although men and women can often perform the same duties from a technical standpoint, there are often situations to which each gender has a different response. In situations where one gender responds in an alternative manner to their prescribed roles, the other sex may not even accept their deviant gender role. The level of reactions experienced by people exposed to foreign cultures can be compared similarly to the reactions of gender behaviors of the opposite sex. The degree of gender differentiation in a country depends primarily on the culture within that nation and its history.

Hofstede's masculine-feminine dichotomy divides organizations into those exhibiting either compassion, solidarity, collectivism and universalism, or competition, autonomy, merit, results and responsibility. The bipolar model follows typical distinctions made between liberal or socialist political philosophy for Hofstede.  Although liberal economies value assertiveness, autonomy, materialism, aggression, money, competition and rationalism, welfare socialism seeks protection and provision for the weak, greater involvement with the environment, an emphasis on nature and well-being, and a strong respect for quality of life and collective responsibilities.  According to Gilligan, this dimension is eurocentric and sexist. During the period of Hofstede's study, 'masculine' societies (USA, Japan, Germany) happened to be the most successful economically, while the successful 'feminine' societies (Scandinavia, Costa Rica, France, Thailand) had smaller populations, less economic scale, and/or strong collective or welfare philosophies.

See also
 Cross-cultural communication
 Cultural relativism
 GLOBE study on Global Leadership and Organizational Behaviour Effectiveness
 Intercultural communication
 National character studies
 Trompenaars's model of national culture differences
 Uncertainty reduction theory

References

Further reading 

, Read it
Alvesson, M. & Deetz, S. (2006). Critical Theory and Postmodernism Approaches to Organizational Studies. In S. Clegg, C. Hardy, T. Lawrence, W. Nord (Eds.). The Sage Handbook of Organization Studies (2nd ed). London: Sage, 255–283.
Coelho, D. A. (2011). A study on the relation between manufacturing strategy, company size, country culture and product and process innovation in Europe. International Journal of Business and Globalisation, 7(2), 152–165.
Fischer, R. (2009). Where is Culture in Cross-Cultural Research?:  An Outline of a Multilevel Research Process for Measuring Culture as a Shared Meaning System. International Journal of Cross Cultural Management, 9: 25–48.
Gilligan, C. (1982). In a Different Voice:  Psychological Theory and Women’s Development. Cambridge MA: Harvard University Press.
Inglehart, Ronald (1997). Modernization and Postmodernization:  Cultural, Economic and Political Change in 43 Societies. Princeton, Princeton University Press.
Inglehart, Ronald & Miguel Basanez, Jaime Diez-Medrano, Loek Halman and Ruud Luijkx (2004) (eds.) Human Beliefs and Values: A Cross-Cultural Sourcebook based on the 1999–2002 values surveys. Mexico, Siglo Beintiuno editors.
Moussetes, A. (2007). The absence of women's voices in Hofstede's Cultural Consequences: A postcolonial reading. Women in Management Review, 22, 443–445.
Schwartz, S.H. (1992). Universals in the content and structure of values:  Theoretical advances and empirical tests in 20 countries. In M.Zanna (Ed.), Advances in Experimental Social Psychology, New York: Academic Press, 25, 1–65.
Schwartz S.H. (1994). Beyond Individualism and Collectivism:  New Cultural Dimensions of Values. In U. Kim, H. C. Triandis, C. Kagitcibasi, S., Choi, C. & Yoon, G. (Eds.), Individualism and Collectivism:  Theory, Method and application.  Thousand Oaks CA: Sage, 85–119.
Schwartz, S.H. (2007). Value Orientations:  Measurement, Antecedents and Consequences across Nations. In J. Jowell, C. Roberts, R. Fitzgerald, G. Eva (Eds.), Measuring Attitudes Cross-Nationally:  Lessons from the European Social Survey. London: Sage.
Smith, P.B. (2004). Nations, Cultures and Individuals : New Perspectives on Old Dilemmas. Journal of Cross-Cultural Psychology, 35, 6–12.
Smith, P. (2008). Indigenous Aspects of Management. In P. Smith, Peterson, M., Thomas, D. (Eds.), The Handbook of Cross-Cultural Management Research. Sage, Thousand Oaks CA: Sage, 319–332.
Smith, P., Peterson, M., Thomas, D. (Eds.). (2008). The Handbook of Cross-Cultural Management Research.  Thousand Oaks CA: Sage.
Triandis, H.C. (1995). Individualism and Collectivism. Boulder CO: Westview Press.
Van de Vijver, F.J.R., van Hemert, D.A., Poortinga, Y.H. (Eds.). (2008). Individuals and Cultures in Multilevel Analysis. Mahwah NJ: Lawrence Erlbaum Associates.

External links 
 Geert Hofstede's academic website
 The Hofstede Centre

Cross-cultural psychology
Organizational culture